Acronicta catocaloida is a moth of the family Noctuidae. It is found in Japan, the Korean Peninsula, China and the Russian Far East (Primorye, southern Khabarovsk, the Amur region and the southern Kuriles).

References

External links
Korean Insects

Acronicta
Moths of Asia
Moths described in 1889